The Swedish National Courts Administration (SNCA) is a Swedish administrative authority organized under the Ministry of Justice. It functions as a service organisation for the Swedish courts, including the general courts, the general administrative courts and a number of special courts.

The SNCA does not hold any powers over these courts. It acts purely as an umbrella organization to provide economy of scale for service, and is responsible for the overall coordination of the courts. It also deals with common issues in the Judiciary of Sweden; such as personnel development, education and information, the preparation of regulations, advice and instructions, and the dissemination of information to citizens. The agency also provide legal information on-line, via a Government website.

History and organisation

The Swedish National Courts Administration was established in 1975 in Jönköping, and is headed by Director-General Martin Holmgren. It is organized into eight departments: Finance Department, Human Resources Department, Development Department, IT Department, Security Department, Communications Department, Administrative Department and Legal Department plus an Internal Audit Office.

See also

Judiciary of Sweden

References

External links
Swedish National Courts Administration - Official Site (English)

Government agencies of Sweden
Judiciary of Sweden
Court administration